All Worked Up is an American reality television series that premiered on truTV on October 19, 2009 and ended on August 15, 2011. The show was filmed simply by following along with North Carolina repossession agents Ron Shirley, Amy Shirley, and Bobby Brantley, while reenacting process server Byran McElderry, South Carolina code enforcement agent Shawn Abron, California parking enforcement agent Jackie Pucci, Florida bail bondsman Harold Jackson, Pennsylvania head of security for Ring of Honor Wrestling Zach Yeager, and others who routinely find themselves in volatile work situations.  Ron, Amy and Bobby also starred in the series' spinoff, Lizard Lick Towing.

Cast

 Ronnie Shirley – Owner of Lizard Lick Towing & Recovery
 Amy Shirley – Co-Owner of Lizard Lick Towing & Recovery
 Bobby Brantley – Employee of Lizard Lick Towing & Recovery
 Byran McElderry – Process Server in the City of New York
 Shawn Abron – Code Enforcement Officer from South Carolina
 Jackie Pucci – Parking Enforcement Officer in Southern California
 Harold Jackson – Bail bondsman in Miami Florida
 Zach Yeagar – Head of Security for Ring of Honor Wrestling in Pennsylvania

External links
 
 http://www.lizardlicktowing.com

2009 American television series debuts
2011 American television series endings
2000s American reality television series
2010s American reality television series
English-language television shows
Television series by Banijay
TruTV original programming